Bobbie Cryner is the self-titled debut from country music singer-songwriter Bobbie Cryner.  It was released on Epic Records in 1993. It features 10 songs; three of them are from outside writers, two are co-writes, and the rest are self-penned.

It featured three charting singles: "Daddy Laid The Blues On Me" which charted at 63 in 1993, "He Feels Guilty", which charted at 68 in 1993, and "You Could Steal Me" which got as high as 72 in 1994. Also included on the disc is a cover of the Buck Owens song, "I Don't Care", included here as a duet with Dwight Yoakam.

Track listing
"He Feels Guilty" (Tommy Polk, Verlon Thompson) — 3:43
"Too Many Tears Too Late" (Carl Jackson, Jim Weatherly) — 3:32
"Daddy Laid The Blues On Me" (Bobbie Cryner) — 3:25
"I Think It's Over Now" (Cryner) — 3:30
"Leavin' Houston Blues" (Cryner) — 3:39
"I Don't Care" (duet with Dwight Yoakam) (Buck Owens) — 2:07
"You Could Steal Me" (Cryner, Jesse Hunter) — 2:56
"I'm Through Waitin' On You" (Cryner, Tim Nichols, Zack Turner) — 3:45
"The One I Love The Most" (Gene Dobbins, Michael Huffman, Bob Morrison) — 3:07
"The Heart Speaks For Itself" (Cryner) — 3:32

Production
Produced By Doug Johnson & Carl Jackson
Engineered By Tommy Cooper, Doug Johnson & Pete Magdaleno
Assistant Engineers: Todd Culross, Gene Rice
Mixing: Tommy Cooper
Digital Editing: Don Cobb
Mastering: Denny Purcell

Personnel
Drums: Owen Hale
Bass guitar: Mike Chapman, Dave Pomeroy
Keyboards: Steve Nathan
Acoustic Guitar: Carl Jackson
Electric Guitar: Pete Anderson, Steve Gibson, Brent Mason
Steel Guitar: Bruce Bouton
Slide Guitar: Bruce Bouton
Dobro: Bruce Bouton, Jerry Douglas
Mandolin: Carl Jackson
Fiddle: Stuart Duncan
Harmonica: Terry McMillan
Cello: John Catchings
Cello Arrangement: Gary Tussing
Lead Vocals: Bobbie Cryner
Background Vocals: Emmylou Harris, Carl Jackson, Dwight Yoakam, Andrea Zonn

References

External links

1993 debut albums
Epic Records albums
Bobbie Cryner albums
Albums produced by Doug Johnson (record producer)